Casey Olson is a retired American mixed martial arts fighter. A professional from 2005 until 2012, he fought in the WEC, Strikeforce, and Tachi Palace Fights promotions.

Background
Olson attended Clovis High School, where he was a two-time captain of the wrestling team. Olson later attended Fresno City College. At FCC, he was a two-time captain, two-time All-American, and State Champion. After two seasons, Olson transferred to Fresno State University where he was a two-time NCAA Qualifier and Northern Regional Champion. Olson was also a two-time captain for Fresno State.

Mixed martial arts career

World Extreme Cagefighting
Olson made his professional debut for California-based promotion, WEC. After compiling a 4-0 record, Olson signed with Strikeforce.

Strikeforce
Olson made his promotional debut at Strikeforce: Tank vs. Buentello, against Bobby Sanchez. Olson won via first-round submission, but would go 6-3 on the regional circuit before returning to face Chris Culley at Strikeforce Challengers: Gurgel vs. Evangelista in 2009. Olson won via first-round TKO.

Tachi Palace Fights
Olson then fought in the Tachi Palace Fights promotion, winning his first two fights before facing Ian Loveland for the TPF Bantamweight Championship. Olson was defeated via knockout in the first round.

Mixed martial arts record

|-
| Loss
| align=center| 14–4
| Ian Loveland
| KO (head kick and punches)
| Tachi Palace Fights 14
| 
| align=center| 1
| align=center| 0:38
| Lemoore, California, United States
| 
|-
| Win
| align=center| 14–3
| Cody Gibson
| Decision (unanimous)
| Tachi Palace Fights 12
| 
| align=center| 3
| align=center| 5:00
| Lemoore, California, United States
| 
|-
| Win
| align=center| 13–3
| Shawn Klarcyk
| Decision (unanimous)
| TPF 4: Cinco de Mayhem
| 
| align=center| 3
| align=center| 3:00
| Lemoore, California, United States
| 
|-
| Win
| align=center| 12–3
| Chris Culley
| TKO (punches)
| Strikeforce Challengers: Gurgel vs. Evangelista
| 
| align=center| 1
| align=center| 2:32
| Fresno, California, United States
|Catchweight (148 lb) bout; Culley missed weight.
|-
| Loss
| align=center| 11–3
| Eddie Yagin
| Submission (guillotine choke)
| PFC 13: Validation
| 
| align=center| 1
| align=center| 1:16
| Lemoore, California, United States
| 
|-
| Win
| align=center| 11–2
| Tony Boyles
| Submission (arm-triangle choke)
| CCFC: Rumble in the Park II
| 
| align=center| 1
| align=center| 2:28
| Fresno, California, United States
| 
|-
| Win
| align=center| 10–2
| Aaron Miller
| Submission (arm-triangle choke)
| CCFC: Rumble in the Park
| 
| align=center| 1
| align=center| 4:30
| Fresno, California, United States
| 
|-
| Win
| align=center| 9–2
| Tito Jones
| Decision (unanimous)
| PFC 9: The Return
| 
| align=center| 3
| align=center| 3:00
| Lemoore, California, United States
| 
|-
| Win
| align=center| 8–2
| Sergio Quinones
| Submission (rear naked choke)
| PFC 8: A Night of Champions
| 
| align=center| 1
| align=center| 0:46
| Lemoore, California, United States
| 
|-
| Loss
| align=center| 7–2
| Olaf Alfonso
| KO (punch)
| PFC: Olson vs. Alfonso
| 
| align=center| 2
| align=center| 1:50
| Lemoore, California, United States
| 
|-
| Win
| align=center| 7–1
| Scott Brommage
| TKO (punches)
| PFC 6: No Retreat, No Surrender
| 
| align=center| 1
| align=center| 1:48
| Lemoore, California, United States
| 
|-
| Win
| align=center| 6–1
| Brandon Jinnies
| Decision (unanimous)
| PFC 3: Step Up
| 
| align=center| 3
| align=center| 3:00
| Lemoore, California, United States
| 
|-
| Loss
| align=center| 5–1
| Isaiah Hill
| Decision (split)
| Warrior Cup 2
| 
| align=center| 3
| align=center| 5:00
| Stockton, California, United States
| 
|-
| Win
| align=center| 5–0
| Bobby Sanchez
| Submission (guillotine choke)
| Strikeforce: Tank vs. Buentello
| 
| align=center| 1
| align=center| 1:58
| Fresno, California, United States
| 
|-
| Win
| align=center| 4–0
| Chris Solomon
| Decision (unanimous)
| WEC 23: Hot August Fights
| 
| align=center| 3
| align=center| 5:00
| Lemoore, California, United States
| 
|-
| Win
| align=center| 3–0
| Alvin Cacdac
| TKO (punches)
| WEC 22: The Hitmen
| 
| align=center| 1
| align=center| 2:28
| Lemoore, California, United States
| 
|-
| Win
| align=center| 2–0
| Joe Martin
| Decision (unanimous)
| WEC 18: Unfinished Business
| 
| align=center| 3
| align=center| 5:00
| Lemoore, California, United States
| 
|-
| Win
| align=center| 1–0
| Rolland Parli
| TKO (punches)
| WEC 16
| 
| align=center| 1
| align=center| 4:58
| Lemoore, California, United States
|

External links
Official Website

References

American male mixed martial artists
Living people
Year of birth missing (living people)